Sighty Crag is a hill in the southern part of the Kielder Forest region in northern England, a region which also includes its fellow Marilyns of Peel Fell and Larriston Fells. It is separated from its higher and more shapely counterpart, Peel Fell, by the low valley in which sits the village of Kielder.

The summit is marked by a wind-worn outcrop of fell sandstone.

The hill is situated in a particularly remote part of northern Cumbria, although the Northumberland border runs over the north top just 600m (660 yd) from the top. It is four miles (6½ km) from the nearest road, making any walk to the summit and back at least eight miles (13 km) long. Though not especially high, in terms of distance from civilisation it is the remotest Marilyn in the whole of England.

See also

 List of Marilyns in England

Marilyns of England
Mountains and hills of Cumbria